Loyd Lewis (born February 23, 1962) is a former American and Canadian football defensive lineman in the Canadian Football League (CFL) and United States Football League (USFL). He played for the Houston Gamblers of the USFL and the Ottawa Rough Riders, Edmonton Eskimos and Winnipeg Blue Bombers of the CFL. Lewis played college football at Texas A&M–Kingsville.

References

1962 births
Living people
Players of American football from Dallas
Players of Canadian football from Dallas
American football defensive linemen
Canadian football defensive linemen
Texas A&M–Kingsville Javelinas football players
Houston Gamblers players
Ottawa Rough Riders players
Edmonton Elks players
Winnipeg Blue Bombers players